Mutasiva was ruler of the Kingdom of Anuradhapura in Sri Lanka, based at the ancient capital of Anuradhapura. He ruled from 367 BC to 307 BC. He had nine sons, some of whom were his successors such Devanampiya Tissa, Uttiya, Mahasiva and Asela.  Mutasiva was the son of King Pandukabhaya.

The king ruled for sixty years which was an unbroken peaceful era of the country.  He was the creator of Mahamevnāwa Park in Anuradhapura which is the only historical record of his accomplishments.

See also
Mahavamsa
List of Sri Lankan monarchs
History of Sri Lanka

References

External links 
 Kings & Rulers of Sri Lanka
 Codrington's Short History of Ceylon

Monarchs of Anuradhapura
Sinhalese kings
4th-century BC Sinhalese monarchs
House of Vijaya